Scott Paul Steward (born 13 June 1965) is a former Australian racing cyclist. He finished in third place in the Australian National Road Race Championships in 1989. He also competed at the 1988 Summer Olympics.

References

External links

1965 births
Living people
Australian male cyclists
Place of birth missing (living people)
Olympic cyclists of Australia
Cyclists at the 1988 Summer Olympics